The Office of the Ombudsman in Ireland was set up under the terms of the Ombudsman Act 1980, as amended by the Ombudsman (Amendment) Act 2012. The current Ombudsman is Ger Deering.

Functions
The Ombudsman is appointed by the President of Ireland upon the nomination of both Houses of the Oireachtas. The Ombudsman deals with complaints against providers of public services including Departments of State, local authorities, the HSE, publicly funded third-level education bodies, nursing homes and direct provision accommodation centres.

The Ombudmsman is  a member of three statutory oversight bodies: the Commission for Public Service Appointments, the Electoral Commission, and the Standards in Public Office Commission.

Extension of remit, 2012
The Ombudsman (Amendment) Act 2012 brought approximately 200 additional public bodies under the scrutiny of the Ombudsman. The Act also designated the Ombudsman as Director (Chief Executive) of the Office of the Commission for Public Service Appointments. The Act was the first in a series of public service reform measures by the Department of Public Expenditure and Reform, the other measures being the Houses of the Oireachtas (Inquiries, Privileges and Procedures) Act 2013, the Protected Disclosures Act 2014, the Freedom of Information Act 2014, the Registration of Lobbyists Act 2015 and the Public Sector Standards Bill 2015.

Proposal for constitutional status
In the 2012 Annual Report, the Ombudsman, Emily O'Reilly argued strongly for constitutional status to be conferred on the Office of the Ombudsman, with a constitutional guarantee of independence from the Government, similar to that enjoyed by the Comptroller and Auditor General.  This appeal was reiterated by her successor, Peter Tyndall.

List of ombudsmen

Other ombudsmen
There are other ombudsmen established in Ireland relating to particular sectors:
The first Pensions Ombudsman, Paul Kenny, was appointed in 2003. Following his retirement in 2016, the office was to be amalgamated with that of the Financial Services Ombudsman, and a new office, the Office of the Financial Services and Pensions Ombudsman, was created by an Act of 2017. In the interim period, pending the passage of this legislation, the then Financial Services Ombudsman, Ger Deering, was appointed as Pensions Ombudsman, holding both offices under separate legislation. 
 Emily Logan became Ireland's first Ombudsman for Children in March 2004. The current holder of that office is Dr. Niall Muldoon.
 The Financial Services Ombudsman incorporated the older offices of the Insurance Ombudsman and Ombudsman for Credit Institutions in 2005.
 Also established in 2005 was the Office of the Ombudsman for the Defence Forces, the first holder being Paulyn Marrinan Quinn, formerly the founding Insurance Ombudsman. 
 An Act of 2005 created a three-person tribunal, the Garda Síochána Ombudsman Commission, to investigate complaints about the country's police force. 
 Legislation has been enacted to establish a Legal Services Ombudsman.  
All these offices are statutory and their holders are public servants.
 A (non-statutory) Press Ombudsman began work in January 2008

The Ombudsman (Amendment) Act 2012 provided for the statutory protection of the title of Ombudsman.

References

External links

 
1980 establishments in Ireland